The Magnificent Seven Deadly Sins is a 1971 British sketch comedy film directed and produced by Graham Stark. Its title is a conflation of The Magnificent Seven and the seven deadly sins. It comprises a sequence of seven sketches, each representing a sin and written by an array of British comedy-writing talent, including Graham Chapman, Spike Milligan, Barry Cryer and Galton and Simpson. The sketches are linked by animation sequences overseen by Bob Godfrey's animation studio. The music score is by British jazz musician Roy Budd, cinematography by Harvey Harrison and editing by Rod Nelson-Keys and Roy Piper. It was produced by Tigon Pictures and distributed in the U.K. by Tigon Film Distributors Ltd.

Avarice 
The first segment, "Avarice", is written by John Esmonde and Bob Larbey. In this segment, a 50p coin falls down a drain and a rich man (Whitsun-Jones) orders his chauffeur (Forsyth) to retrieve it. A fisherman (Hudd) attempts to fish it out. The chauffeur's efforts result only in the coin dropping farther down into the sewer. Other people become involved in the search, including a policewoman (Sims) and one of the workers in the sewer. In the end the rich man, seeing the sewage on the chauffeur, fires him but then falls straight into the open sewer. The chauffeur drops the coin in after him and after replacing the manhole cover, walks away with a purposeful stride.

Cast 
 Bruce Forsyth as Clayton
 Paul Whitsun-Jones as Elsinore
 Bernard Bresslaw as Mr. Violet
 Joan Sims as Policewoman
 Roy Hudd as Fisherman
 Julie Samuel as Petrol Station Attendant
 Cheryl Hall as Vanessa 
 Suzanne Heath as Chloe

Envy 
The second segment, "Envy", is written by Dave Freeman. Stanley (Secombe) and his wife Vera (Cryan) are winners of the football pools and are looking to buy a huge house. His wife spots one and decides she must have it.

The owners (Bayldon and Whitfield) enjoy a quiet life there and do not wish to sell. So Secombe's character decides to employ a series of schemes to force the owners of the house to sell their home so that they can buy it; one of these schemes involves creating a mock edition of the local newspaper that purports to tell the story of a new motorway that will go straight through their garden.

The owners sell to Secombe and wife. As they move in a mechanical digger is seen coming towards the house as it turns out the 'story' is actually true.

Cast 
 Harry Secombe as Stanley  
 Geoffrey Bayldon as Vernon 
 June Whitfield as Mildred   
 Carmel Cryan as Vera

Gluttony 
The third segment, "Gluttony", is written by Graham Chapman and Barry Cryer. In this sketch Phillips is a compulsive eater who has food hidden all around his office.

Cast 
 Leslie Phillips as Dickie
 Julie Ege as Ingrid 
 Patrick Newell as Doctor 
 Rosemarie Reed as Woman
 Sarah Golding as Secretary
 Bob Guccione as Photographer 
 Tina McDowall as Penthouse Pet

Lust 
The fourth segment, "Lust", is written by Graham Stark from a story by Marty Feldman. Ambrose Twombly (Corbett) is determined to find a partner and chats up a woman in an adjoining telephone box by looking through the glass, dialling the number of her telephone and convincing her that he is someone from her past who just happens to be on a "crossed line" by some extraordinary coincidence, cleverly prompting her with some personal details he has managed to spot. She seems quite excited about the prospect of meeting up with him, but before he gets the chance to arrange a meeting she tells him over the phone that there is a man looking at her with a face that looks like "a monkey" in the adjoining phone box (which is, of course, Corbett). The segment ends with a shot of a dangling handset.

Cast 
 Harry H. Corbett as Ambrose Twombly
 Cheryl Kennedy as Greta 
 Bill Pertwee as Cockney Man
 Mary Baxter as Charlady
 Anouska Hempel as Blonde
 Kenneth Earle as Boy Friend 
 Nicole Yerna as Thin Girl 
 Sue Bond as Girl with Glasses
 Yvonne Paul as Receptionist

Pride 
The fifth segment, "Pride", is written by Alan Simpson and Ray Galton. In it, two motorists (Carmichael and Bass) meet facing each other on a narrow country road, and neither is willing to pull aside to let the other pass. In the end, neither wins.

This was a reworking of the writers' Impasse episode in the second (1963) series of Comedy Playhouse. It was remade again in 1996 as an episode of Paul Merton in Galton & Simpson's....

Cast 
 Ian Carmichael as Mr. Ferris 
 Alfie Bass as Mr. Spencer 
 Audrey Nicholson as Mrs. Ferris
 Sheila Bernette as Mrs. Spencer
 Robert Gillespie as A.A. Patrol Man
 Keith Smith as R.A.C. Patrol Man
 Ivor Dean as Policeman

Sloth 
The sixth segment, "Sloth", is written by Spike Milligan. It features a series of silent black and white film clips, with dialogue captions, where people chose to be inactive rather than pursuing a logical course. In particular a tramp who refuses to take his hands out of his pockets, as he is holding his walnuts.  The captions incorporate a running gag on the word "walnut".

Cast 
 Spike Milligan as Tramp 
 Melvyn Hayes as Porter
 Ronnie Brody as Costermonger
 Ronnie Barker 
 Peter Butterworth 
 Marty Feldman 
 Davy Kaye 
 David Lodge 
 Cardew Robinson
 Madeline Smith

Wrath 
The seventh and last segment, "Wrath", is written by Graham Chapman and Barry Cryer.

Two men in a public park (Fraser and Howard) are angered by the park keeper (Lewis, playing his character Inspector Blake from On the Buses in all but name) telling them off for littering, so they try to kill him. Most of their schemes fail, but in the end they succeed, by planting a bomb in a washroom. However, this is only accomplished at the cost that they themselves die too. They think that they are in heaven, and plan to litter it too, but instead they find themselves in hell, and the man they tried to kill is actually the devil.

Cast 
 Ronald Fraser as George 
 Stephen Lewis as Jarvis, the park keeper 
 Arthur Howard as Kenneth

Cast notes
The cast features three James Bond actresses: Anouska Hempel and Julie Ege, who appeared in On Her Majesty's Secret Service, and Madeline Smith, who would later appear in Live and Let Die.  All three had minor roles in those films.

References

External links
 
 

 

1971 comedy films
1971 films
British anthology films
British comedy films
Films shot at Pinewood Studios
Seven deadly sins in popular culture
Films scored by Roy Budd
1970s English-language films
1970s British films